Condé-sur-Sarthe (literally Condé on Sarthe) is a commune in the Orne department in north-western France.

See also
Communes of the Orne department

References

Condesursarthe